National Secondary Route 156, or just Route 156 (or ) is a National Road Route of Costa Rica, located in the Alajuela province.

Description
In Alajuela province the route covers San Ramón canton (San Rafael district).

References

Highways in Costa Rica